Autrans-Méaudre-en-Vercors is a commune in the Isère department of southeastern France. The municipality was established on 1 January 2016 and consists of the former communes of Autrans and Méaudre.

See also 
Communes of the Isère department

References 

Communes of Isère